Larry J. Hornbeck (born September 17, 1943) is an American physicist and inventor of the digital micromirror device (DMD). He took part in the realization of the DLP CINEMA technology while working at Texas Instruments (TI).

Life and career 
Larry Hornbeck received a Ph.D. in physics from Case Western Reserve University in 1974. He joined TI in 1973 and he began work on optical microelectromechanical systems in 1977.

Larry Hornbeck had manufactured and demonstrated the first DMD in 1987.

In 2007, Hornbeck was elected a member of the National Academy of Engineering for the invention and development of the Digital Micromirror Device (DMD) and its application to projection display technology.

Awards and honors 
 Prize for Industrial Applications of Physics (2014-2015)
 Progress Medal from the Royal Photographic Society (2009)
 Elected member of the National Academy of Engineering (2007)
 Academy Award® for his contribution to revolutionizing how motion pictures are created, distributed and viewed (2015)

Bibliography 
 Philippe Binant, "Au cœur de la projection numérique", Actions, Kodak, Paris, Vol. 29, pp. 12-13 (2007).
 Larry Hornbeck, "Digital Light Processing and MEMS : an overview", Texas Instruments, Dallas, Texas.

References

External links 
 
 Texas Business
__notoc__

1943 births
Living people
21st-century American engineers
Members of the United States National Academy of Engineering